Alexei Manziola (born March 29, 1980, in St. Petersburg, Russia) is a former Israeli swimmer, currently residing in Russia.

Manziola a member of Israel's swimming team at the 2000 Summer Olympics in Sydney, Australia, competing in the Men's 4x100 meter Freestyle Relay. Israel set a national record in its preliminary heat (3:22.06), but did not advance to the finals and placed 14th overall.

References

External links
 

1980 births
Living people
Russian Jews
Russian emigrants to Israel
Israeli Jews
Israeli male swimmers
Olympic swimmers of Israel
Israeli male freestyle swimmers
Male butterfly swimmers
Male medley swimmers
Swimmers at the 2000 Summer Olympics
Jewish swimmers